General Harman may refer to:

George Harman (British Army officer) (1830–1892), British Army lieutenant general
Jack Harman (British Army officer) (1920–2009), British Army general
Wentworth Harman (1872–1961), British Army lieutenant general
William Henry Harman (1828–1865), Virginia Militia brigadier general on the side of the Confederacy in the American Civil War

See also
General Harmon (disambiguation)